The Edmonton Police Service (EPS) is the municipal police force for the City of Edmonton, Alberta, Canada. The current chief of the EPS is Dale McFee.

The service has three deputy chiefs two sworn members and a civilian member. Chad Tawfik is responsible for the Corporate Services Bureau, Kevin Brezinski runs the Intelligence and Investigations Bureau, and Darren Derko heads the community policing bureau.

Operational structure

The EPS is divided into Six bureaus:
 Community Policing Bureaus 
 North Bureau & South Bureau
 Intelligence and Investigations Bureau
 Corporate Services Bureau 
 Community Safety and Well-Being Bureau
 Innovation and Technology Bureau

Patrol
The city is divided into divisions for general patrol purposes:
 Northeast
 Northwest
 Downtown
 West
 Southwest
 Southeast

Each division is separated into four smaller districts to allow for better deployment of resources. The majority of police officers of the Edmonton Police Service serve within the community policing bureau as patrol constables, sergeants, detectives, or staff sergeants.

Officers of the Edmonton Police Service have the highest first year constable salaries in Canada at a minimum of $71,195 per annum (or $34.09 an hour), EPS officers who work a shift where half or more of that shift falls between the hours of 4:00 p.m. and midnight receive an extra $1.10 an hour. EPS officers who work a shift where half or more of that shift falls between the hours of midnight and 8:00 a.m. receive an extra $1.20 an hour, increasing the minimum hourly rate for first year constables to $30.47 or about $63,621.00 per annum. Special event policing pays $93.89 an hour. Sergeants and detectives are paid a minimum $120,742.00 per annum, or about $57.82 an hour, and staff sergeants are paid a minimum $132,816.00 per annum, or about $63.60 an hour.

Criminal investigations
Within the specialized community support bureau – criminal investigations division, the major crimes branch is divided into economic crimes, homicide and robbery. These areas are primarily made up of detectives and staff sergeants. The serious crimes area deals with sexual assault, child protection, and vice. These areas are also made up of detectives and staff sergeants. The Edmonton Police Service is also a member of the Alberta Law Enforcement Response Teams.

Guard of Honour and Historical Unit
The EPS Guard of Honour and Historical Unit is a special unit of the EPS composed of dedicated policemen who serve as professional ambassadors of the City of Edmonton to the public. It was introduced to the EPS in 1998, and has provided consistent protocol demonstrations at events such as:

 Remembrance Day parade
 EPS Awards Day
 EPS graduations
 Dignitary escorts
 Police officer funerals and memorials

The historical unit ceremonially represents the EPS at its various historical events. The uniform that is worn is a replica of the EPS uniform worn in the early 1900s.

Pipe Band 

The Edmonton Police Service Pipe Band was formed in 1914, although it was immediately dissolved at the start of the First World War, with its musicians being transferred to the Canadian Army to join Princess Patricia's Canadian Light Infantry and lead the regiment into battle. Members of the pipe band also served as stretcher bearers for the regiment for the duration of the war during the war. The Pipes and Drums of the EPS were re-founded in 1961, and as a result of this historical arrangement, the band has grown closer with the PPCLI unlike other police bands. The band was first invited to play at the PPCLI beating retreat ceremony in 1964 and then at the regimental trooping of the colour in 1967. Today, it is the only non-military civilian band within the Commonwealth to wear the badges of three Canadian regiments: the PPCLI, the Canadian Airborne Regiment and The Loyal Edmonton Regiment. While serving as a public relations tool for the EPS, it still performs alongside the regiments today during public events in Edmonton.

Equipment and vehicle fleet

Road vehicles
 Ford Police Interceptor Utility
 Ford Police Interceptor Sedan
 Chevrolet Tahoe
 Chevrolet Silverado
 Ford F150
 Ford Transit
 Dodge Durango (Unmarked)
 Honda Ridgeline (Unmarked)
 Toyota Sienna (Unmarked)

Each marked vehicle has the Whelen Legacy lightbar, (excluding the Ford Interceptor Sedans that are equipped with LED X light bars and some Code 3 sirens. The EPS uses the D&R RDS 16 siren in the majority of their fleet, as well as the howler brand.

Aircraft

 Eurocopter EC120 Colibri C-FEPS (retired in 2018)
 Eurocopter EC120 Colibri C-GEPS (backup to C-EPU starting in 2018)
 Airbus H125 C-FEPU (entered service in 2018)

Rank insignia

History
Policing in Edmonton dates back to 1892, well before the founding of the province. That was when a town police force took over duties formerly served by the North-West Mounted Police. This followed the Mounties saying they were unwilling to enforce law and order in the city following the 1892 Rat Creek Rebellion.

On July 27, 1892, P.D. Campbell was the first police officer hired by the town of Edmonton. Aside from dealing with law enforcement issues, Campbell was also Edmonton's health and licence inspector.

The Mounties resumed the maintenance of law and order in the City and the Edmonton Police Department was founded to stay in 1894.

In 1911, Alex Decoteau was hired by the Edmonton Police Department. He was the first full-blooded aboriginal to be hired by a police department in Canada.

On October 1, 1912, Annie May Jackson was hired as a police officer. She was the first woman constable in Canada, serving from 1912 to 1918.

Edmonton police officers used an airplane to pursue a criminal in 1919. This was the first time a Canadian police service used this technology in a pursuit. Former WWI ace Wop May flew an airplane to assist the successful pursuit and capture of John Larsen, murderer of Edmonton constable William Nixon.

Policing changes

During the sixth decade of policing, from 1942 to 1952, the department continued to grow.

In 1943, the Neighbourhood Police Force was seen policing Edmonton's streets. An Edmonton police officer was paired up with an American military police officer to patrol because there were many U.S. servicemen in Edmonton at the time. After 18 months, it was discontinued when there was no longer a need for it. The end of the main work on the Alaska Highway, based in Edmonton, and the easing of the Japanese invasion threat meant fewer U.S. personnel in Edmonton by 1944.

Recruit training

In 1947, formal recruit training was introduced. Prior to the formal training, officers were sent to the streets with minimal instruction. After six months of training in 1949, 15 officers graduated.

In 1951, the department recruited in Scotland and Ireland after struggling to meet recruit demands.

In 1955, basic training class number one graduated, with 28 members completing the course.

Edmonton Police's pipe band, which had formed in 1914, halted because of the war. It re-emerged in 1959 and became a visible public relations tool still performing today.

Edmonton's growth
In the 1960s, the towns of Beverly and Edmonton joined and the Jasper Place Police Department joined forces with the Edmonton Police Department, adding the population of Jasper Place to Edmonton.

Sarge, a dog, officially joined the department in 1963. The dog squad grew, and a kennel and training ground were opened by the municipal airport in 1974. The location is the same, and is named after Sarge's owner, Val Vallevand.

In 2021, a new training facility and divisional station opened at 18412 127 Street.

Awards
Each year the Edmonton Police Service honours individuals for their service through a number of awards or medals including:
 Award of Merit
 Medal of Valour and Medal of Honour 
 Exemplary Tactics 
 Jim Dempsey Service Award
 Commendations including: Bravery; Lifesaving; Exceptional Police Investigations; Exceptional Performance; Outstanding Work in the Community; Outstanding Contribution to Police Work; Innovation; and Problem Solving. 
 Long Service Medals (25 years)
 Police Exemplary Service Medal (20 years)

See also
Alberta Law Enforcement Response Teams
Edmonton Fire Rescue Services
Edmonton Police Association

References

External links
 Edmonton Police Service Recruiting
 Edmonton Police Service
 Edmonton Police Service History
 Edmonton Police Association
 Edmonton Police Commission

Law enforcement agencies of Alberta
Municipal government of Edmonton
1892 establishments in Alberta
Government agencies established in 1892